Gymnastics at the 1952 Summer Olympics was represented by 15 events: 7 for women and 8 for men. All events were held between 19 and 24 July in the Messuhalli building in Helsinki. Men's events were held in Exhibition Hall I while women's events were contested in the smaller Exhibition Hall II.

Medal summary

Men's events

Women's events

Medal table

See also

1952 Summer Olympics

References

Sources

 

 
1952 Summer Olympics events
1952
1952 in gymnastics